Mansour Nariman (1935 in Mashhad − 14 July 2015 in Tehran) was an Iranian oud player, researcher and writer.

See also
 Music of Iran

References

 

1935 births
2015 deaths
Iranian oud players
People from Mashhad